Jahanabad (also Romanized as Jahānābād; also known as Jahūnābād) is a village in Bakhtegan Rural District, Abadeh Tashk District, Neyriz County, Fars Province, Iran. At the 2006 census, its population was 1,348, in 323 families.

References 

Populated places in Abadeh Tashk County